The 1993 Camel GT Championship and Exxon Supreme GT Championship seasons were the 23rd season of the IMSA GT Championship auto racing series.  It was the final year of the Camel's sponsorship of the prototype class, and the final year of the GTP and GTP Lights prototype categories before they were replaced with the World Sports Car (WSC) class of prototypes the following year.

Schedule 
The GT classes did not participate in all events.  Races marked with All had all classes on track at the same time.

Entries

Prototypes

GTP

GTP Lights

WSC 
World Sports Cars were classified with GTP cars in the final standings, but were run as a separate class in sprint races.

Le Mans Cars 
Non-GTP prototypes raced at the 24 Hours of Daytona under this class.

GT

GTS 
GTO cars ran as part of the GTS class in endurance races.

GTO 
GTO cars only raced as a separate class at sprint races.

GTU

Invitational GT 
Production-based GT cars were allowed to compete in endurance races and selected sprint races as part of this class, not scoring championship points.

International GT 
A class for ACO-spec GT cars was introduced for the Road America and Laguna Seca races, but no cars appeared at Laguna Seca.

Race results

Championship standings

Drivers' Championships

GTP

GTP Lights

WSC 
WSC cars were counted as part of the GTP class for points standings.

GTS

GTO

GTU

References 

IMSA GT Championship seasons
1993 in American motorsport